Madambakkam Lake, or Madambakkam aeri, is a rain-fed reservoir in Madambakkam, Chennai, India, that is filled only during the monsoon seasons. The lake covers an area of 250 acres.

E.F.I's Restoration Effort

The Madambakkam lake was one of the first water bodies that the Environmentalist Foundation of India took up for cleaning and restoration. From early 2012 the organization has been volunteering to clean the lake with volunteer support over weekends. The 4-year-long volunteer activity hit a road block and later resumed in 2020 as a full-fledged restoration effort. The restoration efforts included complete deepening, bund strengthening, inlet and outlet regulation, neem islands and cleaning.

See also

Water management in Chennai

References

External links
 Madambakkam–A secret gem in the water world

Lakes of Chennai
Reservoirs in Tamil Nadu